Mario Riva (26 January 1913 – 1 September 1960) was an Italian television presenter and actor. He appeared in 51 films between 1941 and 1960.

Life and career
Born in Rome as Mariuccio Bonavolontà, the son of a composer, Giuseppe (Joseph) Bonavolonta (b.1885) and his wife Teresa Chinzari. His father composed over 500 popular tunes including "Goodbye Nemi" and "Fiocca Snow". Mario attended St Joseph College in Piazza di Spagna in Rome.

Riva debuted at young age as a dubber and a radio actor. His film debut was in 1941 in Due cuori sotto sequestro (Two Hearts Seized). He became first known as presenter of the stage show Clan (1942). 

After a long season of successes on stage (often in couple with Riccardo Billi) Riva reached the peak of his career with the RAI variety television Il Musichiere (1957-1960) (the Italian version of Name That Tune). He also appeared on several films, usually in supporting roles. 
While he was presenting from the Arena di Verona the Secondo Festival del Musichiere (a special event linked to the TV program), he inadvertently fell into a hole in the stage covered with a tarpaulin and died from his injuries a few days later.

Selected filmography

 Due cuori sotto sequestro (1941) - Un cantante
 Totò al giro d'Italia (1948) - Giovanni
 Baron Carlo Mazza (1948) - Annunciatore
 The Firemen of Viggiù (1949)
 Yvonne of the Night (1949) - Il ragazzo delle sigarette
 Adam and Eve (1949) - Il naufrago russo
 Toto Looks For a House (1949) - Proprietario agenzia
 Se fossi deputato (1949) - Giuseppino
 Ho sognato il paradiso (1950)
 The Cadets of Gascony (1950) - Mario Fantoni
 Tomorrow Is Another Day (1951) - Pasquale
 Arrivano i nostri (1951) - Mario, il signore
 Accidents to the Taxes!! (1951) - Mario
 The Steamship Owner (1951) - Mario
 My Heart Sings (1951) - Mario
 Porca miseria (1951) - Count Cerri
 Ha fatto 13 (1951) - Himself
 Sardinian Vendetta (1952) - Mario
 Abracadabra (1952) - Amleto
 In Olden Days (1952) - Cliente Schizzinoso (segment "Il carrettino dei libri vecchi")
 Giovinezza (1952) - Venditore ambulante
 Beauties on Motor Scooters (1952)
 Easy Years (1953) - Mario Paolella
 Siamo tutti Milanesi (1953)
 The Country of the Campanelli (1954) - Mago Tarquinio
 It Happened at the Police Station (1954) - 2nd tram driver
 Tripoli, Beautiful Land of Love (1954) - Giulio Cesare
 Laugh! Laugh! Laugh! (1954) - Otello Spinotti
 Scuola elementare (1955) - Pilade Mucci - School Caretaker
 Accadde al penitenziario (1955) - Detenuto No. 77
 La moglie è uguale per tutti (1955) - Mario Rivetti
 Bravissimo (1955) - Dance teacher
 Roman Tales (1955) - The Waiter at the Restaurant on the Sea
 Motivo in maschera (1955)
 Il campanile d'oro (1955)
 I giorni più belli (1956) - Nicola - il salumiere
 Arrivano i dollari! (1957) - Cesaretto Pasti
 Serenate per 16 bionde (1957) - Pippo
 Gente felice (1957) - Francesco
 A sud niente di nuovo (1957)
 Ladro lui, ladra lei (1958) - Commendator Stefano Maghetti
 È arrivata la parigina (1958) - Strettani
 I prepotenti (1958) - Domenico Esposito
 Toto, Peppino and the Fanatics (1958) - Caprioli's Boss
 Gli zitelloni (1958) - Il giudice
 Sergente d'ispezione (1958) - Turconi
 Mia nonna poliziotto (1958) - Mario Secchioni
 Il terribile Teodoro (1958)
 Domenica è sempre domenica (1958) - Himself
 Fantasmi e ladri (1959) - Edmondo Natale
 Prepotenti più di prima (1959) - Il vigile
 Policarpo (1959) - Il pompiere del teatro (uncredited)
 Perfide.... ma belle (1959) - Romolo Proietti
 Il raccomandato di ferro (1959) - Augusto Zinconi
 The Traffic Policeman (1960) - Himself

References

External links

1913 births
1960 deaths
Accidental deaths from falls
Accidental deaths in Italy
Italian male film actors
Male actors from Rome
20th-century Italian male actors
Italian male stage actors
Italian radio personalities
Italian television presenters